State Route 228 (SR-228) is a primarily north–south highway located completely within Leeds, Utah, that begins at the northbound off-ramp at an interchange with Interstate 15 (I-15) and runs northeast to another interchange on I-15. There is also a spur that connects with the southbound on-ramp of the southern interchange.

Route description
From its southern terminus at the northbound off-ramp of the interchange on I-15 at exit 22 in Leeds, SR-228 heads northeast, roughly paralleling I-15 along Main Street, until it turns northwest onto Silver Reef Road. After passing under I-15 it reaches it northern terminus at the southbound off-ramp of the interchange with I-15 at exit 23. The spur begins at the southbound on-ramp  at exit 22 and heads southeast along Cemetery Road until it reaches its terminus at South Main Street (SR-228).

History
SR-228 received its designation in 1981 when the existing local roads were granted state highway status by the Utah State Legislature. Originally, the route began with the current spur (Cemetery Road) and then headed northeast along Main Street for the remainder of the current route (including the portion on Silver Reef Road), but did not include any portion of South Main Street south of Cemetery Road. However, sometime prior to 1998, the official designation had been amended to reflect the current route. It was formerly part of U.S. Route 91.

Major intersections

See also

References

External links

228
 228
Streets in Utah